Pinus strobus, commonly called the eastern white pine, northern white pine, white pine, Weymouth pine (British), and soft pine is a large pine native to eastern North America. It occurs from Newfoundland, Canada west through the Great Lakes region to southeastern Manitoba and Minnesota, United States, and south along the Appalachian Mountains and upper Piedmont to northernmost Georgia and perhaps very rarely in some of the higher elevations in northeastern Alabama. It is considered rare in Indiana.

The Native American Haudenosaunee named it the "Tree of Peace". It is known as the "Weymouth pine" in the United Kingdom, after Captain George Weymouth of the British Royal Navy, who brought its seeds to England from Maine in 1605.

Distribution 

P. strobus is found in the nearctic temperate broadleaf and mixed forests biome of eastern North America. It prefers well-drained or sandy soils and humid climates, but can also grow in boggy areas and rocky highlands. In mixed forests, this dominant tree towers over many others, including some of the large broadleaf hardwoods. It provides food and shelter for numerous forest birds, such as the red crossbill, and small mammals such as squirrels.

Fossilized white pine leaves and pollen have been discovered by Brian Axsmith, a paleobotanist at the University of South Alabama, in the Gulf Coastal Plain, where the tree no longer occurs.

Eastern white pine forests originally covered much of north-central and northeastern North America. Only 1% of the old-growth forests remain after the extensive logging operations from the 18th century to early 20th century.

Old-growth forests, or virgin stands, are protected in Great Smoky Mountains National Park. Other protected areas with known virgin forests, as confirmed by the Eastern Native Tree Society, include Algonquin Provincial Park, Quetico Provincial Park, Algoma Highlands in Ontario, and Sainte-Marguerite River Old Forest in Quebec, Canada; Estivant Pines, Huron Mountains, Porcupine Mountains State Park, and Sylvania Wilderness Area in the Upper Peninsula of Michigan, United States; Hartwick Pines State Park in the Lower Peninsula of Michigan; Menominee Indian Reservation in Wisconsin; Lost 40 Scientific and Natural Area (SNA) and Boundary Waters Canoe Area Wilderness in Minnesota; White Pines State Park, Illinois; Cook Forest State Park, Hearts Content Scenic Area, and Anders Run Natural Area in Pennsylvania; and the Linville Gorge Wilderness in North Carolina, United States.

Small groves or individual specimens of old-growth eastern white pines are found across the range of the species in the USA, including in Ordway Grove, Maine; Ice Glen, Massachusetts; and Adirondack Park, New York. Many sites with conspicuously large specimens represent advanced old-field ecological succession. The tall stands in Mohawk Trail State Forest and William Cullen Bryant Homestead in Massachusetts are examples.

As an introduced species, P. strobus is now naturalizing in the Outer Western Carpathians subdivision of the Carpathian Mountains in Czech Republic and southern Poland. It has spread from specimens planted as ornamental trees.

Description 
Like most members of the white pine group, Pinus subgenus Strobus, the leaves ("needles") are coniferous, occurring in fascicles (bundles) of five, or rarely three or four, with a deciduous sheath.

Cone production peaks every 3 to 5 years.

The branches are spaced about every 18 inches on the trunk with five or six branches appearing like spokes on a wagon wheel. Eastern white pine is self-fertile, but seeds produced this way tend to result in weak, stunted, and malformed seedlings. Mature trees are often 200–250 years old, and some live  over 400 years. A tree growing near Syracuse, New York, was dated to 458 years old in the late 1980s and trees in Michigan and Wisconsin were dated to roughly 500 years old.

Dimensions 

The eastern white pine has been described as the tallest tree in eastern North America, perhaps sharing the prize with the deciduous tulip tree whose range overlaps with eastern white pine in a few areas. No means exist for accurately documenting the height of trees from these times, but eastern white pine may have reached this height on rare occasions. Even greater heights have been reported in popular, but unverifiable, accounts such as Robert Pike's Tall Trees, Tough Men.

Height 
P. strobus grows about  annually between the ages of 15 and 45 years, with slower height increments before and after that age range.

The southern Appalachian Mountains have the most locations and the tallest trees in the present range of P. strobus. One survivor is a specimen known as the "Boogerman Pine" in the Cataloochee Valley of Great Smoky Mountains National Park. It has been climbed and measured by tape drop by the NTS.

The Cook Forest State Park of Pennsylvania has the most numerous collection of  eastern white pines in the Northeast, with 110 trees measuring that height or more. The NTS maintains precise measurements of it.

Diameter 

Mortality and disease 

Because the eastern white pine tree is somewhat resistant to fire, mature survivors are able to reseed burned areas. In pure stands, mature trees usually have no branches on the lower half of their trunks. The white pine weevil (Pissodes strobi) and white pine blister rust (Cronartium ribicola), an introduced fungus, can damage or kill these trees.

Blister rust 
Mortality from white pine blister rust in mature pine groves was often 50–80% during the early 20th century. The fungus must spend part of its lifecycle on alternate hosts of the genus Ribes, the native gooseberry or wild currant. Foresters proposed that if all the alternate host plants were removed, white pine blister rust might be eliminated. A very determined campaign was mounted, and all land owners in commercial pine-growing regions were encouraged to uproot and kill all native gooseberry and wild currant plants. The ramifications for wildlife and habitat ecology were of less concern at the time than timber-industry protection.

Today, native wild currants are relatively rare plants in New England, and planting wild currants or wild gooseberries is strongly discouraged, or even illegal in some jurisdictions. As an alternative, new strains of commercial currants have been developed that are highly resistant to white pine blister rust. Mortality in white pines from rust is only about 3% today.

Conservation status in the United States
Old white pines are treasured in the United States. An American National Natural Landmark, Cook Forest State Park in Pennsylvania, contains the tallest known tree in the Northeastern United States, a white pine named Longfellow Pine. Some white pines in Wisconsin are over 200 years old. Although widely planted as a landscape tree in the Midwestern states, native White pine is listed as "rare or uncommon" in Indiana.

Historical uses

Lumber 
In the 19th century, the harvesting of Midwestern white pine forests played a major role in America's westward expansion through the Great Plains. A quarter-million white pines were harvested and sent to lumber yards in Chicago in a single year.

The white pine had aesthetic appeal to contemporary naturalists such as Henry David Thoreau ("There is no finer tree.") Beyond that, it had commercial applications. It was considered "the most sought and most widely utilized of the various forest growths of the northwest." Descriptions of its uses are quoted below from a 19th-century source:

The species was imported in 1620 to England by Captain George Weymouth, who planted it for a timber crop, but had little success because of white pine blister rust disease.

Old-growth pine in the Americas, of various Pinus species, was a highly desired wood since huge, knot-free boards were the rule rather than the exception. Pine was common and easy to cut, thus many colonial homes used pine for paneling, floors, and furniture. Pine was also a favorite tree of loggers, since pine logs can still be processed in a lumber mill a year or more after being cut down. In contrast, most hardwood trees such as cherry, maple, oak, and ash must be cut into 1" thick boards immediately after felling, or else large cracks will develop in the trunk which can render the wood worthless.

Although eastern white pine was frequently used for flooring in buildings constructed before the U.S. Civil War, the wood is soft and tends to cup over time with wear. George Washington opted for the much harder southern yellow pine at Mount Vernon, instead.

Mast pines 
During the 17th and 18th centuries, tall white pines in the Thirteen Colonies became known as "mast pines". Marked by agents of the Crown with the broad arrow, a mast pine was reserved for the British Royal Navy. Special barge-like vessels were built to ship tall white pines to England. The wood was often squared to better fit in the holds of these ships.

By 1719, Portsmouth, New Hampshire, had become the hub of pine logging and shipping. Portsmouth shipped 199 masts to England that year. In all, about 4500 masts were sent to England.

The eastern white pine played a significant role in the events leading to the American Revolution. Marking of large white pines by the Crown had become controversial in the colonies by the first third of the 18th century. In 1734, the King's men were assaulted and beaten in Exeter, New Hampshire, in what was to be called the Mast Tree Riot. Colonel David Dunbar had been in the town investigating a stock pile of white pine in a pond and the ownership of the local timber mill before caning two townspeople. In 1772, the sheriff of Hillsborough County, New Hampshire, was sent to the town of Weare to arrest mill owners for the illegal possession of large white pines. That night, as the sheriff slept at the Pine Tree Tavern, he was attacked and nearly killed by an angry mob of colonists. This act of rebellion, later to become known as the Pine Tree Riot, may have fueled the Boston Tea Party in 1773. 

After the Revolutionary War, the fledgling United States used large white pines to build out its own navy. The masts of the USS Constitution were originally made of eastern white pine. The original masts were single trees, but were later replaced by laminated spars to better withstand cannonballs.

In colonial times, an unusually large, lone, white pine was found in coastal South Carolina along the Black River, far east of its southernmost normal range. The king's mark was carved into it, giving rise to the town of Kingstree.

Eastern white pine is now widely grown in plantation forestry within its native area.

Contemporary uses

Lumber

Timber framing 
Eastern white pine has often been used for timber frames, and is available in large sizes. Eastern white pine timbers are not particularly strong, so timbers increase in size to handle loads applied. This species accepts stains better than most, but it has little rot resistance, so should be used only in dry conditions.

Characteristics 
Freshly cut eastern white pine is yellowish white or a pale straw color, but pine wood which has aged many years tends to darken to a deep, rich, golden tan. Occasionally, one can find light brown pine boards with unusual yellowish-golden or reddish-brown hues. This is the famous "pumpkin pine". Slow growing pines in old-growth forests are thought to accumulate colored products in the heartwood, but genetic factors and soil conditions may also play a role in rich color development.

This wood is also favored by patternmakers for its easy working.

Foods and medicines 
Eastern white pine needles exceed the amount of vitamin C of lemons and oranges and make an excellent herbal tea. The cambium is edible. It is also a source of resveratrol. Linnaeus noted in the 18th century that cattle and pigs fed pine bark bread grew well, but he personally did not like the taste. Caterpillars of Lusk's pinemoth (Coloradia luski) have been found to feed only on P. strobus.

Pine tar is produced by slowly burning pine roots, branches, or small trunks in a partially smothered flame. Pine tar mixed with beer can be used to remove tapeworms (flat worms) or nematodes (round worms). Pine tar mixed with sulfur is useful to treat dandruff, and marketed in present-day products. Pine tar can also be processed to make turpentine.

 Native American traditional uses
The name "Adirondack", an Iroquois word that means tree-eater, referred to their neighbors (more commonly known as the Algonquians) who collected the inner bark of P. strobus, Picea rubens, and others during times of winter starvation. The white, soft inner bark (cambial layer) was carefully separated from the hard, dark brown bark and dried. When pounded, this product can be used as flour or added to stretch other starchy products.

The young staminate cones were stewed by the Ojibwe Indians with meat, and were said to be sweet and not pitchy. In addition, the seeds are sweet and nutritious, but not as tasty as those of some of the western nut pines.

Pine resin (sap) has been used by various tribes to waterproof baskets, pails, and boats. The Chippewa also used pine resin to successfully treat infections and even gangrenous wounds, because pine resin apparently has a number of quite efficient antimicrobials. Generally, a wet pulp from the inner bark, or pine tar mixed with beeswax or butter was applied to wounds and used as a salve to prevent infection.

Cultivation 
P. strobus is cultivated by plant nurseries as an ornamental tree, for planting in gardens and parks. The species is low-maintenance and rapid-growing as a specimen tree. With regular shearing, it can also be trained as a hedge. Some cultivars are used in bonsai.

Cultivars 
Cultivars have been selected for small to dwarf mature forms, and foliage color characteristics. They include:
MBG:Pinus strobus 'Macopin'
MBG: Pinus strobus 'Paul Waxman'

Christmas trees 
Smaller specimens are popular as live Christmas trees. Eastern white pines are noted for holding their needles well, even long after being harvested. They also are well suited for people with allergies, as they give little to no aroma. A standard  tree takes around 6 to 8 years to grow in ideal conditions. Sheared varieties are usually desired because of their stereotypical Christmas tree conical shape, as naturally grown ones can be sparse, or grow bushy in texture. The branches of the eastern white pine are also widely used in making holiday wreaths and garlands because of their soft, feathery needles.

Water filtration 
White pine xylem has been used as a filter to clean certain bacteria from contaminated water. Hemacytometer tests revealed that at least 99.9% of bacteria tested were rejected after being passed through white pine xylem.

Symbolism 
The eastern white pine is the provincial tree of Ontario, Canada.

In the United States, it is the state tree of Maine (as of 1945) and Michigan (as of 1955). Its "pine cone and tassel" is also the state flower of Maine, and is prominently featured on the state’s license plates. Sprigs of eastern white pine were worn as badges as a symbol of Vermont identity during the Vermont Republic and are depicted in a stained-glass window in the Vermont State House, on the Flag of Vermont, and on the naval ensign of the Commonwealth of Massachusetts and the state of Maine. The 1901 Maine Flag prominently featured the tree during its brief tenure as Maine's state flag. The Maine State Guard also use the tree in their uniform badges.

The Native American Haudenosaunee (Iroquois Confederation) named it the "Tree of Peace".

See also 
 Central Appalachian dry oak–pine forest

References 

 Pinetum.org: Cone photo from Arboretum de Villardebelle
 The Monday Garden: The Eastern White Pine

External links 
 
 
 EFLORAS: P. strobus Distribution map
 
 Bioimages.vanderbilt.edu: Pinus strobus images
 
 Pinus strobus - information, genetic conservation units and related resources. European Forest Genetic Resources Programme (EUFORGEN)
 

strobus
Hardwood forest plants
Trees of Canada
Trees of the United States
Plants described in 1753
Taxa named by Carl Linnaeus
Provincial symbols of Ontario
Symbols of Michigan
Symbols of Maine
Plants used in traditional Native American medicine
Plants used in Native American cuisine
Garden plants of North America
Plants used in bonsai
Ornamental trees